Attack!! is the fourteenth studio album by the Swedish guitarist Yngwie Malmsteen, released on 15 October 2002 through Steamhammer records. The album is the first to feature singer Doogie White on lead vocals, along with keyboardist Derek Sherinian.

Track listing

US edition

Bonus tracks

Japanese/Korean/US limited edition

Bonus track

Personnel
Yngwie J. Malmsteen - Guitars, bass, lead vocals on "Freedom Isn't Free"
Doogie White - Vocals
Derek Sherinian - Keyboards
Patrick Johansson - Drums

References

2002 albums
Yngwie Malmsteen albums